Christopher Maurice Pyne (born 13 August 1967) is a retired Australian politician. As a member of the Liberal Party, he held several ministerial positions in the Howard, Abbott, Turnbull and Morrison governments, and served as a member of parliament (MP) for the division of Sturt from 1993 until his retirement in 2019.

Pyne was elected to the Australian House of Representatives at the 1993 federal election, winning the seat of Sturt in South Australia. In 2007, Pyne was given the portfolios of Assistant Minister for Health and Ageing and Minister for Ageing while serving in the Howard government, which he held until the Liberal-National Coalition's loss at the 2007 election. While in opposition, Pyne was appointed Manager of Opposition Business in the House. After the Coalition's victory at the 2013 election, Pyne entered the Cabinet of Australia and became Leader of the House and Minister for Education. Upon the election of the Turnbull government at the 2015 Liberal leadership ballot, he remained Leader of the House and became Minister for Industry, Innovation and Science. With the reelection of the government in 2016, he became the Minister for Defence Industry. Upon the installment of the First Morrison ministry in August 2018, he became the Minister for Defence.

Pyne retired from politics at the 2019 Australian federal election. In June 2019, he was appointed as an industry professor at the University of South Australia. In the same month Pyne started a new defence industry consulting job, prompting a Senate investigation into a potential breach of Ministerial Standards.

Early years and education
The fifth and youngest child of ophthalmic surgeon, Remington Pyne and his wife Margaret, Pyne was born in Adelaide, South Australia in 1967. He was educated at Saint Ignatius' College and the University of Adelaide, where he graduated with a Bachelor of Laws and was President of Adelaide University Liberal Club from 1987 to 1988.

Pyne attained a Graduate Diploma in Legal Practice from the University of South Australia in 1991. In 2022, he was granted an Honorary Doctorate in the School of the Professions from his alma mater, the University of Adelaide.

Background
Pyne was a research assistant to Senator Amanda Vanstone and later became President of the South Australian Young Liberals from 1988–1990. He was pre-selected as the Liberal candidate for the safe Labor seat of Ross Smith at the 1989 state election but was defeated by the sitting member and Premier of South Australia, John Bannon. He earned a Graduate Diploma of Legal Practice at the University of South Australia and began practising as a solicitor in 1991.

Parliament
At the 1993 election, aged 25, Pyne was elected to the South Australian Division of Sturt in the House of Representatives. He had earlier defeated Sturt incumbent Ian Wilson in a Liberal pre-selection ballot for the seat. Wilson had held the seat for all but one term since the 1966 election. Between them, he and his father, Keith, had held the seat for all but four years since its creation in 1949. Wilson was 35 years Pyne's senior; indeed, he had won his first election a year before Pyne was born.

Pyne is a republican and established himself as a member of the moderate, "small-l liberal" faction of the Liberal Party, supporting then Deputy Leader Peter Costello. Pyne remains a close ally of state Liberal Vickie Chapman.

In 1994, after serving as a backbencher for a period, Pyne was appointed Parliamentary Secretary to the Shadow Minister for Social Security. He retained this position after John Howard was elected as leader, and up to the 1996 election.

Howard Government

After the 1996 Coalition victory Pyne sat as a backbencher. Pyne chaired the Australia Israel Parliamentary group from 1996 to 2004. In 2003, he was appointed Parliamentary Secretary to the Minister for Family and Community Services, where he remained until 2004, when named Parliamentary Secretary to the Minister for Health and Ageing. As Parliamentary Secretary, he defended the government's "War on drugs" and established his strong support of illicit drug prohibition, as opposed to harm minimisation. He launched the youth mental health initiative Headspace.

Pyne served as a Parliamentary Secretary until 30 January 2007 when he was appointed Assistant Minister for Health and Ageing. He held this portfolio until 21 March, when he was elevated to the outer ministry as Minister for Ageing, succeeding resigning Minister, Senator Santo Santoro.

In Opposition
Pyne came close to losing Sturt at the 2007 election to Labor candidate Mia Handshin, after suffering a 5.9 percent two-party swing to finish with a 0.9 percent two-party margin (856 votes), which made Sturt the most marginal seat in South Australia. Following the election in which the John Howard-led Coalition government was defeated by the Kevin Rudd-led Labor opposition, Pyne put himself forward as a candidate for Deputy Leader of the Liberal Party at the 2007 Liberal leadership ballot. Julie Bishop prevailed with 44 votes, ahead of Andrew Robb who won 25 votes, while Pyne came third with 18 votes. Following the election of Brendan Nelson as party leader, Pyne was appointed Shadow Minister for Justice and Border Protection.

Following Malcolm Turnbull's ascension at the 2008 Liberal leadership ballot, Pyne was elevated to Shadow Cabinet as Shadow Minister for Education, Apprenticeships and Training. After Bishop stepped down from the portfolio of Shadow Treasurer, Joe Hockey took up the portfolio, with Pyne replacing Hockey as Manager of Opposition Business in the House on 16 February 2009.

Pyne was reappointed as Manager of Opposition Business in the House and Shadow Minister for Education, Apprenticeships and Training by Tony Abbott after he deposed Turnbull at the 2009 Liberal leadership ballot. Pyne was re-elected at the 2010 election, receiving a 2.5 percent two-party swing to finish with a marginal 53.4 percent two-party vote, which made neighbouring Boothby the most marginal seat in South Australia. Pyne was re-appointed as Manager of Opposition Business in the House and Shadow Minister for Education, Apprenticeships and Training.

Abbott Government

Pyne was re-elected to Sturt at the 2013 election, receiving a 6.5 percent two-party swing to finish with a 60.1 percent two-party vote, making Sturt a safe Liberal seat on paper. Pyne was elevated to the Cabinet of Australia on 18 September 2013 as Leader of the House and Minister for Education in the Abbott Government. In December 2014, his portfolio was renamed to Minister for Education and Training.

As Minister for Education and Training, Pyne enacted changes to the education system to provide minimum standards for teachers, promoted independent public schooling, expanded phonics teaching, and created a new national curriculum. Pyne also attempted to reform the university sector to introduce market principles but was rejected by the Senate.

In May 2014, Pyne suggested that HECS debts should be reclaimed from the estates of deceased students.

Turnbull Government

Despite much speculation Pyne would be appointed as Defence Minister, he remained Leader of the House and was appointed as Minister for Industry, Innovation and Science in the Turnbull Government following Malcolm Turnbull's re-ascension at the 2015 Liberal leadership ballot. As Minister for Industry, Innovation and Science, Pyne was credited with creating and implementing the National Innovation and Science Agenda (NISA).

With the reelection of the Government in 2016, Pyne became the Minister for Defence Industry in the Second Turnbull Ministry. As Minister for Defence Industry, Pyne was given responsibility for implementing the largest modernisation of the Australian Defence Force since the Second World War, increasing the Australian Government's investment in defence capability to almost $200 billion.

Between February 2016 and March 2019, Pyne co-hosted weekly television program Pyne & Marles on Sky News Live with Labor MP Richard Marles.

Pyne retained Sturt at the 2016 election for the Liberals with a 55.9 percent two-party vote from a 4.2 percent two-party swing, reducing the seat from a safe to marginal status.

Pyne has stated he has always been in favour of same-sex marriage. In November, the Australian Federal Police investigated claims that his Twitter account was compromised after the account had been found to have liked a pornographic image depicting a gay sexual act.

Morrison Government

Following the change of Prime Minister on 24 August 2018, Pyne was promoted to Minister for Defence.

On 2 March 2019 Pyne announced that he would not recontest the seat of Sturt at the next federal election; and would retire from politics. The House of Representatives was dissolved on 11 April 2019.

Lobbying 
Pyne was listed on the South Australian lobbyist register on 26 July 2019 as a co-owner of GC Advisory Pty Ltd, which he co-owns with Adam Howard. The firm's many clients include Duxton Capital, Hickinbotham Group, Polites Group, RacingSA, the City of Burnside and Thomson Geer Lawyers.

In 2021, Pyne was interviewed  by Christopher Lim and Kendall O'Donnell, contributors for The Bruges Group, on CANZUK, Australia's COVID policy, the UK-Australia Free Trade Agreement, and Australia's role in the Indo-Pacific. Pyne praised Prime Minister Scott Morrison's leadership and COVID policy, as well as the Foreign Relations Act (2020). Pyne was praised for "accurately depicting the Australian perspective on the Indo-Pacific and Australia's national security interests". Kendall O'Donnell's performance was praised for his "steadfast questioning and pertinent points made around national security issues", and Lim's questions were described as "demonstrating incredible awareness of Australia's domestic debate and constitutional issues."

Post-political career
Since retiring from Parliament in April 2019, Pyne has chaired the strategic advisory and public affairs firm, Pyne and Partners operating offices in Sydney, Canberra and Adelaide. He also chairs Vision2020 Australia, the national peak eye health body and the Australia United Arab Emirates Business Council.

Since late 2020, Pyne has taken on roles in the Australian defence industry. He is Chairman of the Advisory Board of Australia’s largest Australian owned small arms and munitions company Nioa, and Chairman of the Advisory Board of the Australian Missile Corporation. He also sits on the board of ASX Listed, Xtek Ltd, a Canberra based body armour and unmanned Vehicle manufacturer and supplier globally.

Apart from not for profit, Vision2020Australia, Pyne is the Chairman of the SA Governors of the American Chamber of Commerce in Australia, and an Ambassador of the Adelaide Football Club.

Personal life
Christopher Pyne and his wife Carolyn have four children, Barnaby, Felix, Aurelia, and Eleanor. He currently resides in Adelaide.

Bibliography
A Letter To My Children (2015), non-fiction
The Insider (2020), non-fiction

References

External links
 
 
 

|-

|-

|-

|-

|-

|-

|-

1967 births
Living people
Abbott Government
Australian republicans
Defence ministers of Australia
Government ministers of Australia
Lawyers from Adelaide
Leaders of the Australian House of Representatives
Liberal Party of Australia members of the Parliament of Australia
Members of the Australian House of Representatives
Members of the Australian House of Representatives for Sturt
Members of the Cabinet of Australia
Turnbull Government
Sky News Australia reporters and presenters
Adelaide Law School alumni
University of South Australia alumni
21st-century Australian politicians
20th-century Australian politicians
Morrison Government